Melisende of Cyprus (1200 Holy Land- after 1249), was the youngest daughter of Queen Isabella I of Jerusalem by her fourth and last marriage to King Aimery of Cyprus. She had a sister Sibylla of Lusignan, a younger brother, Amalric who died as a young child. By her mother's previous marriages, Melisande had three half-sisters, Maria of Montferrat, who succeeded their mother as queen of Jerusalem on 5 April 1205; Alice of Champagne, and Philippa of Champagne.

Marriage and issue 
In January 1218, Melisande married Prince Bohemond IV of Antioch. The marriage produced three daughters:
 Isabella (died young)
 Maria (died after 10 December 1307), she was childless.
 Helvis (died young)

Melisende protested the succession of her nephew King Henry I of Cyprus as regent of Jerusalem on the death of her half-sister Alice in 1246. Alice had been regent of Jerusalem for Conrad IV of Germany.

She died sometime after 1249. Upon the childless death of her only surviving daughter, Marie  sometime after December 1307, the line of Melisende became extinct.

References

Sources
 

1200 births
13th-century deaths
Year of death unknown
Women of the Crusader states
Princesses of Antioch
Countesses of Tripoli
Daughters of kings